Aldehyde dehydrogenase 1 family, member L2 also known as ALDH1L2 is an enzyme that in humans is encoded by the ALDH1L2 gene. ALDH1L2 is the mitochondrial isoform of a similar enzyme, ALDH1L1, which converts 10-formyltetrahydrofolate to tetrahydrofolate and carbon dioxide.

References

External links

Further reading